A by-election was held for the Australian House of Representatives seat of Wannon on 7 May 1983. This was triggered by the resignation of Liberal Party MP and former Prime Minister Malcolm Fraser.

Results

See also
 List of Australian federal by-elections

References

1983 elections in Australia
Victorian federal by-elections
1980s in Victoria (Australia)
May 1983 events in Australia